CSAR, or Csar may refer to:

 Caris Spatial Archive, a file format for storing bathymetry data
 Center for the Simulation of Advanced Rockets
 Central South African Railways
 Combat search and rescue
 Cosa succederà alla ragazza, a 1992 music album by Lucio Battisti
 Comité secret d'action révolutionnaire, a French anti-communist group better known as La Cagoule
 Alternate spelling of the title of nobility, Tsar
 Günther Csar (born 1966)